The Melrose Building is a building in downtown Houston, Texas, United States. Completed in 1952 as Houston's first International Style skyscraper, the building is listed on the National Register of Historic Places.

Following a major renovation and restoration, the building opened as Le Méridien Houston Downtown in September 2017.

See also
 National Register of Historic Places listings in downtown Houston, Texas

References

1952 establishments in Texas
Buildings and structures completed in 1952
Buildings and structures in Houston
International style architecture in Texas
National Register of Historic Places in Houston